Le Fieu is a commune in the Gironde department in Nouvelle-Aquitaine in southwestern France.

Geography 
Le Fieu is about 49 km to the northeast of Bordeaux and around 23 km to the Northeast of Libourne. The commune borders the commune of Les Églisottes-et-Chalaures in the North, Saint-Christophe-de-Double in the Northeast, Porchères in the Southeast, Coutras in the South and Southeast and Les Peintures in the West.

Population

See also
Communes of the Gironde department

References

Communes of Gironde